This page details statistics of the UEFA Cup and UEFA Europa League. Unless notified these statistics concern all seasons since inception of the UEFA Cup in the 1971–72 season, including qualifying rounds. The UEFA Cup replaced the Inter-Cities Fairs Cup in the 1971–72 season, so the Fairs Cup is not considered a UEFA competition, and hence clubs' records in the Fairs Cup are not considered part of their European record.

General performances

By club

A total of 29 clubs have won the tournament since its 1971 inception, with Sevilla being the only team to win it six times, and only one to win three in a row. A total of fifteen clubs have won the tournament multiple times: the forementioned club, along with Liverpool, Juventus, Inter Milan, Atlético Madrid, Borussia Mönchengladbach, Tottenham Hotspur, Real Madrid, IFK Göteborg, Parma, Feyenoord, Chelsea, Porto and Eintracht Frankfurt. A total of 32 clubs have reached the final without ever managing to win the tournament.

Clubs from eleven countries have provided tournament winners. Spanish clubs have been the most successful, winning a total of thirteen titles. Italy and England are second with nine each, while the other multiple-time winners are Germany with seven, Netherlands with four, and Portugal, Sweden and Russia with two each. The only other countries to provide a tournament winner are Belgium, Ukraine, and Turkey. France, Scotland, Yugoslavia, Hungary, and Austria have all provided losing finalists.

The 1980 UEFA Cup saw four Bundesliga teams (i.e., Bayern Munich, Eintracht Frankfurt, Borussia Mönchengladbach, and VfB Stuttgart) make up all of the semi-finals competitors — a unique record for one country. Frankfurt beat Mönchengladbach in the final.

Clubs from a total of 53 European cities have participated in the tournament final. Clubs from 27 cities have provided winners, with the clear city leaders being Sevilla and Madrid (six and five respectively).

By nation

By city

By player 
 Most titles: José Antonio Reyes (5)
 Atlético Madrid (2): 2009–10, 2011–12
 Sevilla (3): 2013–14, 2014–15, 2015–16

By manager 
 Most titles: Unai Emery (4)
 Sevilla (3): 2013–14, 2014–15, 2015–16
 Villarreal (1): 2020–21

All-time top 25 UEFA Cup and Europa League rankings 

Note: Clubs ranked on theoretical points total (2 points for a win, 1 point for draw, results after extra time count, all matches that went to penalties count as draw). Includes qualifying matches.

Number of participating clubs by country of the Europa League era
The following is a list of clubs that have played or will be playing in the Europa League group stage.

Season in Bold: Team qualified for knockout phase that season

Number of participating clubs in the group stage of the UEFA Cup era

Team in Bold: qualified for knockout phase

Club appearances

Performance review

By semi-final appearances

Consecutive appearances 

 As of 3 November 2022 

Bold = Ongoing streakItalics = Currently in Champions League, but may still drop down to Europa League

Undefeated champions
 The only teams in UEFA Cup history to win the tournament undefeated are:
 Tottenham Hotspur (1972)
 Borussia Mönchengladbach (1979)
 Göteborg (1982, 1987)
 Ajax (1992)
 Galatasaray (2000)
 Feyenoord (2002)
 Chelsea (2019)
 Villarreal (2021)
 Eintracht Frankfurt (2022)

Consecutive wins
 Atlético Madrid hold the record of most consecutive wins (both home and away) with 15 spanning the 2011–12 and 2012–13 seasons.

Miscellaneous records
 Only four clubs have won the treble of their national league championship, domestic cup competition and the UEFA Cup all in same season. They are:
 Porto (2003, 2011)
 IFK Göteborg (1982)
 Galatasaray (2000)
 CSKA Moscow (2005)
 Twelve clubs have won their national league championship and the UEFA Cup in the same season. They are:
Liverpool (1973, 1976)
 IFK Göteborg (1982, 1987)
 Porto (2003, 2011)
 Feyenoord (1974)
 Borussia Mönchengladbach (1975)
 Juventus (1977)
 PSV Eindhoven (1978)
 Real Madrid (1986)
 Galatasaray (2000)
 Valencia (2004)
 CSKA Moscow (2005)
 Zenit Saint Petersburg (2008)
 Until 1997, the UEFA Cup was the only European club competition which routinely allocated multiple entrants to many countries. This has led to several finals featuring two clubs from the same country:

 During the 1979–80 season, West Germany had five entrants including cup holders Borussia Mönchengladbach. All five managed to reach the quarter-final stage and both semi-finals ended up being all West German affairs. Ultimately, Eintracht Frankfurt defeated Borussia Mönchengladbach in the final. No West German club that season was eliminated by a non-German club.
 During the 1997–98 season, France had seven entrants: Strasbourg as winner of French Coupe de la Ligue, Nantes as third-placed team from French Division 1, FC Girondins de Bordeaux as fourth-placed team from French Division 1, Metz as fifth-placed team from French Division 1, and also Auxerre, Bastia and Lyon as 1997 UEFA Intertoto Cup Group winners. Nevertheless, only one, Auxerre, reach the quarter-finals, where they were eliminated by Lazio.
 Two clubs have managed to win consecutive UEFA Cups/Europa Leagues: Real Madrid in 1985 and 1986, and Sevilla (twice) in 2006 and 2007 and then again in 2014, 2015 and 2016.
 The only countries to have won for three consecutive seasons are Italy (twice) and Spain. Italy: between 1988–89 and 1990–91 (Napoli, Juventus, and Internazionale the winners) and between 1992–93 and 1994–95 (Juventus, Internazionale, and Parma). Spain: 2014, 2015 and 2016 (Sevilla)
Entering both the Champions League and/or its qualifying rounds and the UEFA Cup in the same season has now become so common that a separate statistic of all clubs having done so in three or more consecutive seasons may be of interest (the means of entering the UEFA Cup is indicated in the last column in chronological order, G denoting group stage, q denoting qualifying round):

 Several times, winning the UEFA Cup was a club's only chance to qualify for European competition in the next season. A win by such a mid-table (and non-domestic-cup-winning) club then led to an extra place in the UEFA Cup for the country in question. The following clubs managed to save their season by winning the UEFA Cup:

Highest attendances

Overall (UEFA Cup/Europa League)
1. 110,000 – Real Madrid 0–0 Ipswich Town, 3 October 1973, First round second leg

2. 93,000 – Real Madrid 2–1 Torino, 1 April 1992, Semi-finals first leg

3. 92,000 – Dynamo Kyiv 1–1 Eintracht Braunschweig, 14 September 1977, First round first leg

4. 90,832 – Barcelona 0–0 Liverpool, 5 April 2001, Semi-finals first leg

Sources:

Europa League only
1. 90,225 – Barcelona 2–2 Manchester United, 16 February 2023, Knockout round play-offs first leg

2. 80,465 – Tottenham Hotspur 2–2 Gent, 23 February 2017, Round of 32 second leg

3. 79,468 – Barcelona 2–3 Eintracht Frankfurt, 14 April 2022, Quarter-finals second leg

4. 75,180 – Manchester United 1–1 Liverpool, 17 March 2016, Round of 16 second leg

5. 75,138 – Manchester United 1–1 Celta Vigo, 11 May 2017, Semi-finals second leg

Sources:

Individuals' goals

Most goals in a single match

The record for most goals scored in a single match across all UEFA Cup/Europa League seasons is held by Eldar Hadžimehmedović, after he scored six goals for Lyn against NSÍ Runavík in the 2003–04 qualifying round.

Europa League only

Most goals in a single season
UEFA Cup and Europa League

Goals in different finals 
UEFA Cup and Europa League

All-time top goalscorers

Including qualifying rounds

Bold = Still active

Excluding qualifying rounds

All-time appearances

Including qualifying rounds

Excluding qualifying rounds

Records
 Highest win in one leg, most goals in game:
 1984–85, First round:
 Ajax 14–0 Red Boys Differdange
 Highest aggregate win, most goals in tie:
 1972–73, First round:
 Feyenoord 9–0 Rumelange
 Rumelange 0–12 Feyenoord
 Feyenoord won 21–0 on aggregate
 Best second-leg comebacks: (4 goals)
 1984–85, Second round:
 Queens Park Rangers 6–2 Partizan
 Partizan 4–0 Queens Park Rangers
 6–6 on aggregate, Partizan won on away goals
1985–86, Third round:
 Borussia Mönchengladbach 5–1 Real Madrid
 Real Madrid 4–0 Borussia Mönchengladbach
 5–5 on aggregate, Real Madrid won on away goals
 2018–19, Third qualifying round:
 Dinamo Minsk 4–0 Zenit Saint Petersburg
 Zenit Saint Petersburg 8–1 Dinamo Minsk  (4–0 after 90 minutes)
 Zenit Saint Petersburg won 8–5 on aggregate
 Best away-leg come-back after losing home leg: (3 goals)
 2009–10, play-off round:
 Dinamo București 0–3 Slovan Liberec
 Slovan Liberec 0–3 Dinamo București 
 Dinamo București won 9–8 on penalties
 Final comeback:
 1988:
 Espanyol 3–0 Bayer Leverkusen
 Bayer Leverkusen 3–0 Espanyol   
 3–3 on aggregate, Bayer Leverkusen won 3–2 on penalties
 Highest aggregate score in the final:
 1993:
 Borussia Dortmund 1–3 Juventus
 Juventus 3–0 Borussia Dortmund
 Juventus won 6–1 on aggregate

References

Bibliography

See also
 UEFA Super Cup
 UEFA club competition records and statistics
 UEFA Cup Winners' Cup records and statistics

UEFA Europa League records and statistics
records and statistics